Thoresby House is one of three London residence halls owned by the College of Global Studies at Arcadia University.  This residence hall is used for the University's study abroad programme participants.

Thoresby House is in Hoxton within the London Borough of Hackney, on the border of Islington.  Located on Thoresby Street, just off City Road, Thoresby House is close to Angel and Old Street tube stations on the Northern line in zone 1. There are many bus routes that stop along City Road near Thoresby House, including the 43, 205, 214, and 394. Thoresby House is within walking distance of City University.

References

Education in the London Borough of Hackney
Buildings and structures in the London Borough of Hackney
Arcadia University